Kiwi Soccers is an American Samoan football club, currently playing in the ASFA Soccer League Division 1, the top level of football in American Samoa.

League performance

2010
The club first competed in the ASFA Soccer League in 2010, finishing third in Pool A and qualifying for the knockout rounds. In the preliminary round they beat Ilaoa and Toomata 1–0 before losing 0–3 to Fagasa Youth in the quarter final.

2011
The club finished fourth in pool A in the 2011 season and did not progress to the knockout rounds.

2012
The club finished bottom of Division 1 in the 2012 season and will have to play a relegation play-off to avoid demotion to division 2.

Women's team
The club also run a women's team.

References

Football clubs in American Samoa
Association football clubs established in 2010
2010 establishments in American Samoa